Events in the year 1954 in Spain.

Incumbents
Caudillo: Francisco Franco

Births
January 10 – Margarita Mariscal de Gante
February 8 – Jorge Comas
May 27 – José María Esteban
July 8 – Pedro Balcells
September 1 – Manuel Díaz Vega

Deaths

See also
 List of Spanish films of 1954

References

 
Years of the 20th century in Spain
1950s in Spain
Spain
Spain